The 2012 Aegon GB Pro-Series Barnstaple was a professional tennis tournament played on indoor hard courts. It was the fifth edition of the tournament which was part of the 2012 ITF Women's Circuit. It took place in Barnstaple, England, on 29 October–4 November 2012.

WTA entrants

Seeds 

 1 Rankings are as of 22 October 2012.

Other entrants 
The following players received wildcards into the singles main draw:
  Sabrina Bamburac
  Laura Deigman
  Amanda Elliott
  Emily Webley-Smith

The following players received entry from the qualifying draw:
  Karen Barbat
  Mayya Katsitadze
  Constance Sibille
  Kateřina Vaňková

Champions

Singles 

  Annika Beck def.  Eleni Daniilidou 6–7(1–7), 6–2, 6–2

Doubles 

  Akgul Amanmuradova /  Vesna Dolonc def.  Diāna Marcinkēviča /  Aliaksandra Sasnovich 6–3, 6–1

External links 
 2012 Aegon GB Pro-Series Barnstaple at ITFTennis.com
 

Aegon GB Pro-Series Barnstaple
Aegon GB Pro-Series Barnstaple
2012 in English tennis